is a town located in Higashiusuki District, Miyazaki Prefecture, Japan.

As of October 1, 2019, the town has an estimated population of 17,526 and the density of 145 persons per km². The total area is 120.52 km².

Geography

Neighbouring municipalities 

 Nobeoka
 Hyuga
 Misato

Transportation

Highways 

 Japan National Route 327
 Japan National Route 388
 Japan National Route 446

References

External links

Kadogawa official website 

Towns in Miyazaki Prefecture